The second season of the American neo-Western television series Justified premiered on February 9, 2011, on FX, and concluded on May 4, 2011, consisting of 13 episodes. The series was developed by Graham Yost based on Elmore Leonard's novels Pronto and Riding the Rap and his short story "Fire in the Hole". Its main character is Raylan Givens, a deputy U.S. Marshal. Timothy Olyphant portrays Givens, a tough federal lawman, enforcing his own brand of justice in his Kentucky hometown. The series is set in the city of Lexington, Kentucky, and the hill country of eastern Kentucky, specifically in and around Harlan.

Plot
Season two arc deals primarily with the criminal dealings of the Bennett clan. The season begins where the first left off. Raylan chases Boyd who is chasing Gio's niece who murdered Boyd's father Bo. Raylan catches up to both and he delivers Gio's critically wounded niece to Gio where a truce is struck between Gio and Raylan with Raylan's former boss threatening to kill Gio himself if Raylan dies. The Bennett family matriarch Mags Bennett (Margo Martindale) and her three sons Dickie (Jeremy Davies), Coover (Brad William Henke), and Bennett Police Chief Doyle (Joseph Lyle Taylor) run the criminal enterprises of Bennett County. However while Mags is secretly attempting to legitimize her family and give her grandchildren a “legacy deal”, Dickie and Coover attempt to expand, thus catching the ire of the Marshal Service and Raylan. Due to a long-standing feud between the Givens and Bennett families centering on an incident long ago and reignited in the current generation between Raylan and Dickie in their youth (an incident which left the latter with a lame leg), things begin to become very complicated, with their pasts catching up with them. Meanwhile, a depressed Boyd goes back to mining and attempts to legitimize himself, even informing on some crimes to Raylan. However, when a group threatens Ava, Boyd's reluctantly drawn back in to the criminal life. However he turns the tables on his partners, who were planning on killing him, by outsmarting them. Boyd steals some the heist money for Ava so she can save her house and he explains to her being a criminal; is just who he is. Mags's plan is revealed that she's using Dickie and Coover to buy land from the citizens of Bennett County who believe she's attempting to stop a mining conglomerate. The land is key for the conglomerate. Boyd figures out her plan and he helps Mags close her deal giving the Bennett family a portion of the mining conglomerate. In exchange Mags gives Boyd control of running crime in Harlan and Bennett County but only if Boyd stays out of the marijuana business. Angered by this, Dickie attempts to start his own criminal empire and threatens Boyd. Boyd recruits some of his friends and Arlo Givens and takes the weed business from Dickie. Dickie recognizes Arlo and kills Arlo's wife Helen in retaliation sparking Raylan's own desire for revenge and a further rift between father and son. After threatening to destroy Mags's deal, Raylan gets Dickie but is unable to kill him and sends him to jail instead. After Mags's deal is complete she gets someone else to confess to Dickie's crimes and tells Dickie that Doyle's children's future is safe and now she was again in charge in Bennett County. As the Bennetts and the Crowders go to war, Raylan attempts to keep the peace. Other stories include Raylan and Winona attempting a new relationship, Winona stealing money from the Marshal's evidence locker forcing Raylan to help her, Raylan discovering Winona's new husband put a hit out on them, and Art's growing lack of trust in Raylan. One other major component involves Mags murdering the father of Loretta McCready, a teenage girl that Mags sees a surrogate daughter. As the season progresses Raylan becomes determined to protect Loretta as she slowly finds out the truth.

Cast and characters

Main
 Timothy Olyphant as Deputy U.S. Marshal Raylan Givens
 Nick Searcy as Chief Deputy U.S. Marshal Art Mullen
 Joelle Carter as Ava Crowder
 Jacob Pitts as Deputy U.S. Marshal Tim Gutterson
 Erica Tazel as Deputy U.S. Marshal Rachel Brooks
 Natalie Zea as Winona Hawkins
 Walton Goggins as Boyd Crowder

Recurring

Guest
 Jim Beaver as Shelby Parlow
 Steven Flynn as Emmitt Arnett
 James LeGros as Wade Messer
 Stephen Root as Judge Mike Reardon

Production
FX ordered a second season of 13 episodes on May 3, 2010.

Casting
Walton Goggins, who had a recurring role in the first season as Boyd Crowder, was promoted to series regular beginning with the second season.

Filming
Episodes were shot in California. The small town of Green Valley, California often doubles for Harlan, Kentucky.

Episodes

Reception
On Rotten Tomatoes, the season has an approval rating of 100% with an average score of 8.8 out of 10 based on 28 reviews. The website's critical consensus reads, "Justified finds its footing in its second season with an expanded cast of characters that enriches its seedy world." On Metacritic, the season has a weighted average score of 91 out of 100, based on 12 critics, indicating "universal acclaim.

Robert Bianco of USA Today praised Margo Martindale's performance, stating: "Like the show itself, Margo Martindale's performance is smart, chilling, amusing, convincing and unfailingly entertaining. And like the show, you really don't want to miss it." Slant Magazine critic Scott Von Doviak praised Olyphant's performance and the writing for this season, observing: "Justified's rich vein of gallows humor, convincing sense of place, and twisty hillbilly-noir narratives are all selling points, but it's Olyphant's devilish grin that seals the deal."

Awards
For the second season, it received four acting nominations for the 63rd Primetime Emmy Awards—Timothy Olyphant for Outstanding Lead Actor in a Drama Series, Walton Goggins for Outstanding Supporting Actor in a Drama Series, Margo Martindale for Outstanding Supporting Actress in a Drama Series, and Jeremy Davies for Outstanding Guest Actor in a Drama Series, with Martindale winning.

Ratings
The second season averaged 2.649 million viewers and a 0.9 rating in the 18–49 demographic, improving 9.6% in viewership from the first season.

Home media release
The second season was released on Blu-ray and DVD in region 1 on January 3, 2012, in region 2 on July 18, 2011, and in region 4 on September 5, 2012. Special features on the season two set include deleted scenes, three behind-the-scenes featurettes, and outtakes.

References

External links

 

02
2011 American television seasons